Danny Niv (born March 2, 1975 in Rishon LeZion, Israel), better known as Mooki is an Israeli singer and rapper, best known as the frontman for successful Israeli hip hop/punk act Shabak Samech between 1992 and 2000, and again since 2007. He is also a successful solo artist. In Shabak Samech, he was also known by the nickname Mookie D, given him due to the resemblance of his voice to the voice of Mike D of the Beastie Boys.

Biography
Born under the name  Daniel Neyburger, Mooki broke out into the music scene at the age of 17, when he formed the hip hop act Shabak Samech with a bunch of friends. The band proved successful among the Israeli youth and sold thousands of records. The band was active from 1992 until 2000, releasing three studio albums and one live album. The band reunited in 2007 for a short tour across Israel and a new album.

After the disbandment of Shabak Samech in 2000, Mooki went on to a successful solo career, in collaboration with his Shabak Samech co-member Piloni (Danny Kark). Mooki's first solo album was Shma Israel (שמע ישראל) which was released in 2001. The band proved to be very successful, sold 25,000 copies and went gold. The album included guest appearances from artists such as Yuval Banai, Kwami and more. Successful singles from the album included "מדברים על שלום" (Talking About Peace), which was written about the will for peace at the days of the Second Intifada, "ילדה סוכר" (Sugar Girl) and "האדמה בוכה" (The Land Cries) which featured Yuval Banai. The same year, Mooki was chosen as "Singer of the Year" in Israeli radio station Galgalatz's year's end awards.

In 2002, Mooki had his big screen debut as an actor when he played a small role in the Israeli movie Broken Wings. In 2003, he had a role in the first season of the Israeli TV show "שבתות וחגים" (Weekends and Holidays), and in 2004 he had a role in the movie "תיאום כוונות" (Adjusting Sights).

In 2005, Mooki released his second solo album – Okef Mi'Lemala (עוקף מלמעלה) which was also recorded with Piloni, who composed, produced and arranged all of the songs. The biggest hit from the album was the single "עוקף מלמעלה" (Coming from Above). Mooki said he was surprised by the success of the album as the album was very different from his previous works and that most songs were not radio-friendly. The album was released on a label Mooki and Piloni formed the same year, called ''' Shabak Music. In 2006, Mooki performed vocals on the song "מעצבי דעת הקהל" (Shapers of Public Opinion) on the album Al Ha'Mishmeret by Rami Fortis and Berry Sakharof. In 2007, he performed a new song with Izhar Ashdot called "מטעי הדובדבן של אוקראינה" (Ukraine's Cherry Plantations), and on the song "החיים" (The Life) with Shlomo Artzi.

In April 2008, Mooki released his third album Be'emet ve Mikarov (באמת ומקרוב) which was an acoustic album, featuring acoustic renditions of songs from Mooki's two previous albums. The album featured an acoustic cover of "לומדת לעוף" (Learning to Fly) by Dana Berger, which featured Dana Berger herself.

Also in 2008, Shabak Samech, who reunited back in 2007 for a short tour across Israel, released their fourth studio album, Boom Carnival.

In the summer of 2009, Mooki recorded a punk rock album with the Israeli punk rock band Useless ID. Mooki wrote all the lyrics, while Useless ID frontman and bassist Yotam Ben-Horin was responsible for the music and arrangements. The collaboration of Mooki & Useless ID started performing live shows together in August 2009, with the album released on January 7, 2010, followed by a special release show on January 28, 2010 at the Barby club in Tel Aviv, Israel.Mooki states that the collaboration started when Mooki spotted the band performing live at the Motorola MotoMusic' event and asked the band to collaborate with him, which led to the recording of the song "לא רוצה להתבגר" (Don't Want to Grow Up), which became the theme song for the Israeli sitcom Ramzor. After the recording of the song, Mooki showed Useless ID frontman Yotam Ben-Horin some more songs he wrote and within days Ben-Horin has arranged the lyrics with his own music into full songs, which led to the band entering the studio with producer Yossi Fine to record a full-length album.http://www.mouse.co.il/CM.shows_item_show,408,208,20177,.aspx

Discography

SoloShma Israel (שמע ישראל, Listen Israel) (2001)Okef Mi'Lemala (עוקף מלמעלה, Coming from Above) (2005)Be'emet ve Mikarov (באמת ומקרוב, Up Close and Personal) (2008)Lev Hofshi (לב חופשי, Unfettered Heart) (2014)Yeled Shel Aba (ילד של אבא ההופעה, Father's Son - Live) (2015)

w/ Shabak SamechShabak ('שב"ק ס, Shabak) (1995)Be'atifa shel Mamatak (בעטיפה של ממתק, In a Candy Wrap) (1997)Shabak Be'hofa'a (שב"ק ס' בהופעה February 20, 1998, Shabak live) (1998)C'naan 2000 (כנען 2000, Kna'an 2000) (2000)Boom Carnival (בום קרנבל, Boom Carnival) (2008)

w/ Useless IDMooki & Useless ID'' (2010)

References

External links
Shabak Samech Myspace page
Shabak Samech Facebook page

1975 births
Living people
Israeli rappers
21st-century Israeli male singers
People from Rishon LeZion
People from Yavne
Jewish rappers
Israeli male singer-songwriters
20th-century Israeli male singers